is the administrative centre of Andøy Municipality which is located in the Vesterålen district of Nordland county, Norway.  The village of Andenes is the northernmost settlement of the island of Andøya (and in Nordland county).  To the east is the island of Senja (in Troms county), and to the west the endless horizon of the North Atlantic Ocean.  Andenes Lighthouse sits along the harbor and can be seen for long distances.  Andøya Airport, Andenes is located just south of the village, off of Norwegian County Road 82.

History

Andenes was already an important fishing village during the Iron Age. By the early 1900s, it had become one of the largest fishing ports in Norway.

The municipality of Andenes was established on 1 January 1924 when it was separated from Dverberg municipality.  Initially, Andenes had 2,213 residents.  On 1 January 1964, Andenes was merged with Dverberg and Bjørnskinn municipalities to create the new municipality of Andøy.

In the early 1980s, the population of the village of Andenes was 3,770, which made it the largest village in Vesterålen. The downsizing of Andøya Air Station and general population centralization in Norway has led to a dramatic decline in inhabitants over the last 20 years.

Tourism has become an important sounce of income for Andenes in recent years. The town's location on the coast by a narrow section of continental shelf has led to the town becoming a major centre for whale watching.

Name
The Old Norse form of the name was Andarnes (from originally Amdarnes). The first element is the genitive case of Ömd (the old name of the island Andøya) and the last element is nes which means "headland".

Air Station
The construction of Andøya Air Station was commissioned in 1952 and funded in large part by NATO. It was to be situated between Haugnes and Andenes. A DC-3 Dakota of the Royal Norwegian Air Force (RNoAF) undertook the first landing on 17 September 1954. The air station however was not fully operative until 15 September 1957.

In 1961, the 333 Squadron was moved from Sola Air Station to Andøya with their Grumman HU-16 Albatross.  In 1969, these were replaced by the Lockheed P-3 Orion. In 1989, the Lockheed P-3C Orion replaced the aging P-3Bs. However, two of the newest P-3Bs were converted to P-3Ns and fly missions for the Norwegian Coast Guard. Besides fisheries, Andøya Air Station has been the largest workplace in Andøy since the 1970s.

In the autumn of 2011, an Orion aircraft from Andenes patrolled the Indian Ocean from a forward base in the Seychelles, supported by 44 personnel and contributing 29 patrols of 8–10 hours to NATO's anti-piracy operation.  The flights led directly to the arrest of five pirate groups.

Geography
The sun is below the horizon from November 25 to January 28.

Climate
Andenes is surrounded by the sea on all sides, which moderates both winter and summer temperatures. It has a climate on the boundary between the subarctic and the subpolar oceanic climates, being mild for its latitude. Summers are very cool, whereas even during the polar night period, daytime highs typically rise above freezing.

Culture
Andenes Church is located in the central part of the village. The local newspaper is named Andøyposten.  Andenes hosts the annual "Rock mot Rus" (Rock against drugs) festival, where young people perform their own rock music as well as more known headliner such as Dead by April, Dimmu Borgir, Kvelertak, Turdus Musicus and Torch.

Notable residents
Tom Stenvoll, footballer for Stabæk
David Pedersen, singer known from the TV-show Idol
Nanna With, Norwegian journalist

References

External links 

Official site
Web-cam of Andenes harbour
Coast Flights to and from Andenes

Andøy
Villages in Nordland
Populated places of Arctic Norway